Roderick John Flower , also known as Rod, is a British pharmacologist, and professor at Barts and The London School of Medicine and Dentistry. 
Dr. Flower is a member of the board of directors of Antibe Therapeutics and on the scientific advisory board of Morria.

Flower was educated at Woodbridge School, and graduated with a first class degree in Physiology, from the University of Sheffield in 1971. He was Chair of Pharmacology at the University of Bath from 1985 to 1990. He was Wellcome Principal Research Fellow, from 1994 to 2007.

He was President of the British Pharmacological Society from 2000 to 2003.

References

External links
 http://www.uel.ac.uk/wwwmedia/schools/hab/research/ProfRoderickFlower-PublicLecture-UEL-2Nov2011.pdf
 

Alumni of the University of Sheffield
Fellows of the Royal Society
Fellows of the Academy of Medical Sciences (United Kingdom)
Academics of Barts and The London School of Medicine and Dentistry
Living people
British pharmacologists
Fellows of the British Pharmacological Society
Year of birth missing (living people)